Strophotina is a genus of moths belonging to the family Tortricidae.

Species
Strophotina apparata  Razowski & Pelz, 2003
Strophotina chorestis (Razowski & Becker, 1999)
Strophotina curvidagus  Brown, 1998
Strophotina niphochondra (Razowski & Becker, 1999)
Strophotina strophota  Meyrick, 1926

References

 , 1998: Strophotina, a new tortricid genus from Central and South America (Lepidoptera: Tortricidae). Proceedings of the Entomological Society of Washington 100: 43-49. 
 , 1926: Exotic Microlepidoptera. Exotic Microlepidoptera 3(8): 225-256.

External links
tortricidae.com

Euliini
Tortricidae genera